Tortuguero Conservation Area is an administrative area which is managed by SINAC for the purposes of conservation in Limón Province, northeastern Costa Rica. 

It contains a national park, several wildlife refuges and protected zones.

Protected areas
 Barra del Colorado Wildlife Refuge 
 Border Corridor Wildlife Refuge
 Cariari National Wetlands
 Dr. Archie Carr Wildlife Refuge 
 Guácimo and Pococí Protected Zone
 Tortuguero  National Park
 Tortuguero Protected Zone

External links 
 Official Tortuguero Conservation Area website
 Tortuguero Conservation Area, Welcome Page

Conservation Areas of Costa Rica
Geography of Limón Province